The Remains of the 13 Levels is a former smelter plant in Lianxin Village, Ruifang District, New Taipei, Taiwan. It is also called the Potala Palace of Mountain Mines.

History
Originally built in 1933 by Japanese during their occupation, the building used to be a copper and gold smelter plant called the Shuinandong Smelter that used to process refined ore from Jinguashi and Jiufen. After the handover of Taiwan from Japan to the Republic of China in 1945, the refinery was taken over by the state-run company. In 1973, the copper and gold minerals from the area had been exhausted and subsequently the activity and company were shut down.

During World War II between 1942 and 1945, the Japanese Empire sent approximately one thousand prisoners of war (POWs) to the gold mines surrounding the smelting plant. The POWs were from allied nations, including the United Kingdom, Canada, the Netherlands, Australia, New Zealand, South Africa and the United States. The Taiwan POW Memorial Park now stands in memory of the POWs that died in the harsh mining conditions.

The site and the surrounding mining infrastructure are listed as potential world heritage sites.

Architecture
The building has three long exhausts pipes running up the hillside, which released toxic exhaust gasses when it had been in operation. At a length of 2 km and a diameter of 2 meters, it is the world's longest pipe.

Popular culture
The building has been featured in several music videos.

The building was illuminated for the 2019 Moon Festival as a collaboration between the current owner, Taiwan Power Company, and two artists Chou Lien (周鍊) and Joyce Ho (何采柔).

See also
 Mining in Taiwan

References

Buildings and structures in New Taipei
Industrial buildings in Taiwan
Mining in Taiwan
Tourist attractions in New Taipei